Hedda is a 1975 film adaptation of Henrik Ibsen's 1891 play Hedda Gabler. It stars Glenda Jackson, Peter Eyre, and Patrick Stewart (in his screen debut) and was directed by Trevor Nunn.

This film was the first (and, as of 2019, the only) major theatrical film version of the play in English. Other productions of the play in English with sound have been made for television.

It was nominated for the Academy Award for Best Actress (Glenda Jackson). The film was also screened at the 1976 Cannes Film Festival, but wasn't entered into the main competition.

Cast
 Glenda Jackson - Hedda Gabler
 Peter Eyre - Jørgen Tesman
 Timothy West - Judge Brack
 Jennie Linden - Thea Elvsted
 Patrick Stewart - Ejlert Løvborg
 Constance Chapman - Juliane Tesman (Aunt Julie)
 Pam St. Clement - Berthe

Critical reception
In The New York Times, Vincent Canby praised Jackson's performance: "This version of “Hedda Gabler” is all Miss Jackson's Hedda and, I must say, great fun to watch ... Miss Jackson's technical virtuosity is particularly suited to a character like Hedda. Her command of her voice and her body," and concluded, "the physical production is handsome, and Mr. Nunn is most successful in preserving the claustrophobic nature of the play without creating a static film. Hedda is an imaginative, intelligent film version of a play that I wasn't breathlessly waiting to see at this moment."  Judith Crist of Saturday Review wrote: "a startlingly fresh and perceptive version written and directed by Trevor Nunn and ingeniously interpreted by Jackson. Seldom has a classic been so well served." J.C. Trewin wrote in The Illustrated London News: "No Hedda, seeking an object she cannot determine, has been more infinitely bored, or more dangerous."

Awards and nominations

Notes

References

External links
 

1975 films
1975 drama films
Films shot at EMI-Elstree Studios
Films based on works by Henrik Ibsen
Films directed by Trevor Nunn
Films scored by Laurie Johnson
British drama films
1970s English-language films
1970s British films